Association Shams is a Tunisian organization for LGBT rights, campaigning for sexual minority rights in Tunisia. The non-governmental, non-profit organisation derives its name from the Sufi mystic Shams Tabrizi (with  also being Arabic for "sun") and its logo is made up of two whirling dervishes.

Foundation and guidelines 
Association Shams was legally registered under Tunisian law on May 18, 2015.
The focus of the organisation is the decriminalisation of homosexuality. On their website, they published a set of other goals such as: 
 Raising awareness about sexually transmitted diseases
 Mentoring and supporting sexual minorities around the country by providing financial, emotional and psychological help.
 Defending the rights of minorities and provide a safe environment regardless of their sexual orientation or gender difference.

Radio Shams
In 2017, Radio Shams was created to help give LGBT voices in North Africa more representation. The founder was sent 4000 death threats within the first two weeks of operation.

Incidents and controversy 
The existence of Association Shams has been received with scepticism by Tunisians. Several public figures were opposed to the existence of an LGBT activist group in the country. Homosexuality is still criminalized under Tunisian law. As stated by the Article 230 of the Tunisian Penal code, homosexuality is a punishable crime and people accused of it can face up to three years in prison. The authorities accuse people with sodomy without proper evidence and oblige them to undergo anal tests that have no medical relevance.

In December 2015, a controversy took place in several local media outlets and following that a case was filed against the organisation by Kamel Hedhili, the head of state litigation. The government stated that Shams is violating the association law of the country and that it deviated from its main course. The activities of the NGO were suspended for a whole month starting from January 4, 2016 by a decree of the Tunisian Court of First Instance.

One of the founders and leading LGBT activists of the organisation, Ahmed Ben Amor, faced harassments and death threats upon openly sharing his views and campaigning for the NGO on Tunisian TV.

Following the controversy supermarkets and public spaces banned the entrance of homosexuals to their premises. The sign « No Homosexuals allowed » showed up in different neighbourhoods around the capital city Tunis.

References

2015 establishments in Tunisia
Human rights organisations based in Tunisia
LGBT political advocacy groups in Tunisia
Non-profit organizations based in Africa